July 15 - Eastern Orthodox liturgical calendar - July 17

All fixed commemorations below are celebrated on July 29 by Old Calendar.

For July 16th, Orthodox Churches on the Old Calendar commemorate the Saints listed on July 3.

Saints
 Saint Kyriakos the Executioner (Cyriacus), who had beheaded the martyr Antiochus of Sulcis, then converted to Christ and was beheaded (c. 110)  (see also: December 13)
 Martyr Faustus, by crucifixion, under Decius (c. 249-251)
 Martyrs Paul and his two sisters Chionia (Thea) and Alevtina (Valentina) at Caesarea Palaestina (308)  (see also: July 18)
 Hieromartyr Athenogenes, Bishop of Heracleopolis, and his ten disciples (c. 311)
 Martyr Athenogenes, by fire.
 Martyr Antiochus of Sebaste, Physician (4th century)
 15,000 Martyrs of Pisidia, who believed in Christ through Saint Marina, by the sword.
 Many Holy Women Martyred by the sword.
 Saint Anastasius I, Bishop of Thessaloniki, a father of the Fourth Ecumenical Council (via his representative) (451)
 Saint Auxitheus (or Eudoxius), Bishop of Thessaloniki, one of the great Fathers of the Fourth Ecumenical Council (458)

Pre-Schism Western saints
 Saint Domnio, a martyr in Bergamo in Italy under Diocletian (c. 295)
 Saint Valentine of Trier, Bishop of Trier in Germany (or more probably Tongres in Belgium), under Diocletian (c. 305)
 Virgin-martyr Julia of Carthage, by crucifixion, at Corsica (c. 440)
 Martyr Helier of Jersey (6th century)
 Saint Reineldis (Raineldis, Reinaldes) and Companions, martyred by the Huns (c. 680)
 Saint Generosus, Abbot of Saint-Jouin-de-Marnes in Poitou in France (c. 682) 
 Saint Ténénan, Bishop of Léon (7th century)
 Saint Vitalian of Capua, Bishop of Capua in Italy (7th century)
 Saint Vitalian of Osimo, Bishop of Osimo in Italy (776) 
 Martyr Sisenandus Córdoba, a Deacon in the church of St Acisclus in Córdoba in Spain, beheaded under Abderrahman II (851)
 Saint Irmengard (Irmgard of Chiemsee), Abbess of Buchau and then of Chiemsee in Germany (866)

Post-Schism Orthodox saints
 Saint John of Vishnya and Mt. Athos, activist against Uniatism (c. 1630)
 New Martyr John of Turnovo (1822)
 Saint Theodotus, monk of Glinsk Hermitage (1859)

New martyrs and confessors
 New Hieromartyrs Seraphim, Theognostus, and others of Alma-Ata (1921)
 Venerable Schema-Abbess Magdalena (Dosmanova) of New Tikhvin Convent in Siberia (1934)
 New Confessor Matrona Belyakova, Fool-for-Christ, of Anemnyasevo (1936) 
 New Hieromartyrs Jacob (Maskaev), Archbishop of Barnaul, and Priests Peter Gavrilov and John Mozhirin, and with them Monk-martyr Theodore (Nikitin) and Martyr John (1937)
 New Hieromartyr Ardalion (Ponamarev), Archimandrite, of Kasli (Chelyabinsk) (1938)

Other commemorations
 Icon of the Mother of God of Chirsk-Pskov (1420)

Icon gallery

Notes

References

Sources
 July 16/July 29. Orthodox Calendar (PRAVOSLAVIE.RU).
 July 29 / July 16. HOLY TRINITY RUSSIAN ORTHODOX CHURCH (A parish of the Patriarchate of Moscow).
 July 16. OCA - The Lives of the Saints.
 July 16. The Year of Our Salvation - Holy Transfiguration Monastery, Brookline, Massachusetts. 
 The Autonomous Orthodox Metropolia of Western Europe and the Americas (ROCOR). St. Hilarion Calendar of Saints for the year of our Lord 2004. St. Hilarion Press (Austin, TX). p. 52.
 The Sixteenth Day of the Month of July. Orthodoxy in China.
 July 16. Latin Saints of the Orthodox Patriarchate of Rome.
 The Roman Martyrology. Transl. by the Archbishop of Baltimore. Last Edition, According to the Copy Printed at Rome in 1914. Revised Edition, with the Imprimatur of His Eminence Cardinal Gibbons. Baltimore: John Murphy Company, 1916. p. 209.
 Rev. Richard Stanton. A Menology of England and Wales, or, Brief Memorials of the Ancient British and English Saints Arranged According to the Calendar, Together with the Martyrs of the 16th and 17th Centuries. London: Burns & Oates, 1892. pp. 341–344.

 Greek Sources
 Great Synaxaristes:  16 ΙΟΥΛΙΟΥ. ΜΕΓΑΣ ΣΥΝΑΞΑΡΙΣΤΗΣ.
  Συναξαριστής. 16 Ιουλίου. ECCLESIA.GR. (H ΕΚΚΛΗΣΙΑ ΤΗΣ ΕΛΛΑΔΟΣ). 
  16/07/. Ορθόδοξος Συναξαριστής.

 Russian Sources
  29 июля (16 июля). Православная Энциклопедия под редакцией Патриарха Московского и всея Руси Кирилла (электронная версия). (Orthodox Encyclopedia - Pravenc.ru).
  16 июля по старому стилю / 29 июля по новому стилю. СПЖ "Союз православных журналистов". .
  16 июля (ст.ст.) 29 июля  (нов. ст.). Русская Православная Церковь Отдел внешних церковных связей. (DECR).

July in the Eastern Orthodox calendar